Salomon Jadassohn (13 August 1831 – 1 February 1902) was a German pianist, composer and a renowned teacher of piano and composition at the Leipzig Conservatory.

Life

Jadassohn was born to a Jewish family living in Breslau, the capital of the Prussian province of Silesia. This was a generation after the emancipation of the Jews in Central European German-speaking lands and during a time of relative tolerance. First educated locally, Jadassohn enrolled at the Leipzig Conservatory in 1848, just a few years after it had been founded by Felix Mendelssohn. There he studied composition with Moritz Hauptmann, Ernst Richter and Julius Rietz, as well as piano with Ignaz Moscheles. At the same time, he studied privately with Franz Liszt in Weimar. On 13 April 1851 in Weimar he was the soloist at the first performance, under Liszt's baton, of Liszt's arrangement for piano and orchestra of Carl Maria von Weber's Polonaise (Polacca) brillante "L'hilarité" in E major, Op. 72.

As a Jew, Jadassohn could not qualify for the many church jobs as music directors or organists which were usually available to Christian graduates of a conservatory such as Leipzig, as they required deep knowledge of Christian liturgy and practice. Instead he worked for a Leipzig synagogue and a few local choral societies as well as teaching privately. Eventually, he was able to qualify for a position at the Leipzig Conservatory, teaching piano and composition.

Over the years, he became a renowned teacher, and Ferruccio Busoni, Frederick Delius, Paul Homeyer, Richard Franck, Sigfrid Karg-Elert, Ruben Liljefors, Elisabeth Wintzer, Emil Reznicek and Felix Weingartner, Bernard Zweers and Cornelis Dopper were among his many students. Americans also studied with him, including the song composer Jean Paul Kürsteiner and George Strong, a composer of the late 19th and early 20th century. He died in Leipzig, aged 70.

His daughter, Bertha, was married to operetta composer Leo Fall.

Work

Jadassohn composed more than 140 works in virtually every genre, including four symphonies, four Serenades for Orchestra and one for Flute and String Orchestra, two piano concertos, lieder, sonatas, opera and a considerable amount of chamber music, including a string quartet, four piano trios, three piano quartets, three piano quintets and a serenade for flute and string quintet. These chamber works rank among his finest compositions. Considered a master of counterpoint and harmony, he was also a gifted melodist, following in the tradition of Mendelssohn. His works also show the influence of Wagner and Liszt, whose music deeply impressed him.  In addition, he wrote several important books on composition and music theory.

Reputation
The general consensus is that Jadassohn and his music were not better known for two reasons: the first is the pre-eminence of his contemporary Carl Reinecke.  Reinecke was a world-famous piano virtuoso and composer, but also an important professor at the Leipzig Conservatory, where Jadassohn taught. Reinecke later served as its director and, at the same time, held the post of conductor of the renowned Leipzig Gewandhaus Orchestra.

The second reason was the influence of the rising tide of antisemitism in late 19th century Wilhelmine Germany.  In the wake of Wagner, many music critics attacked Jadassohn's works, labeling it academic and dry, epithets which have stuck with it since.
 
Since his death, his music has been seldom performed, but in the 21st century, a reevaluation of it has begun with new performances and recordings.  Cameo Classics commenced a programme of recording his neglected orchestral works. His Symphony No.1 was recorded with the Belarusian SSO with Marius Stravinsky conducting. Concerto for Piano and Orchestra No. 1 Op. 89 in C minor was performed to acclaim at a public premiere (since his death) by soloist Valentina Seferinova and the Karelia State Philharmonic Orchestra, conducted by Denis Vlasenko in Petrozavodsk, Russia on 20 December 2008. A CD including these works was issued by Cameo Classics in January 2009. Jadassohn composed four Serenades for Orchestra and the first three received their premiere recordings from Cameo Classics in 2011, along with his Serenade for Flute and Strings (Soloist Rebecca Hall) with the Malta Philharmonic Orchestra.

Hyperion Records released a recording of Jadassohn's two piano concertos.

The record label cpo has released recordings of the four symphonies and both cavatinas by the Brandenburgisches Staatsorchester Frankfurt conducted by Howard Griffiths.

Selected list of works

Symphonies
Symphony 1 in C major, Op.24 (1861)
Symphony 2 in A major, Op.28 (1865)
Symphony 3 in D minor, Op.50 (1876)
Symphony 4 in C minor, Op.101 (1889)

Concertante works with orchestra
Piano Concerto 1 in C minor, Op.89 (1887)
Piano Concerto 2 in F minor, Op.90 (1888)
Cavatina for Violin and Orchestra in F major, Op.69 (1882)
Cavatina for Cello and Orchestra in F major, Op.120 (1894)

Organ works
Fantasie in G minor, Op. 95

Chamber music
Sextet for piano 4 hands, 2 violins, viola, cello, Op.100 (1888)
Piano Quintet 1 in C minor, Op.70 (1883)
Piano Quintet 2 in F major, Op.76 (1884)
Piano Quintet 3 in G minor, Op.126 (1895)
Piano Quartet 1 in C minor, Op.77 (1884)
Piano Quartet 2 in G major, Op.86 (1887)
Piano Quartet 3 in A minor, Op. 109 (1890)
String Quartet in C minor, Op.10 (1858)
Piano Trio 1 in F major, Op.16 (1858)
Piano Trio 2 in E major, Op.20 (1860)
Piano Trio 3 in C minor, Op.59 (1880)
Piano Trio 4 in C minor, Op.85 (1887)
Violin Sonata in G minor, Op.5 (1857)
Notturno op.133 for flute and piano
Capriccio op.137 for flute and piano

Other
 Serenade No. 3 in A major, Op. 47 (1876)

See also

References

 Cobbett's Cyclopedic Survey of Chamber Music, Oxford University Press, 1963
 The New Grove Dictionary of Music, MacMillan, 1980
 Some of the information on this page appears on the website of Edition Silvertrust but permission has been granted to copy, distribute and/or modify this document under the terms of the GNU Free Documentation License.
 Piano Concerto No. 1 in C minor, Op. 89 and Symphony No. 1, Op. 24; CD issued as  
Piano Concerto No. 1 & Piano Concerto No. 2 recorded on Hyperion CDA 67636

External links
 
 
 
 Salomon Jadassohn Piano Trio No.4, Op.85 & Piano Quartet No.1, Op.77, Piano Quintet No.3, Op.126, sound-bites (recorded on Real Sound CD # RS 051-0036, 2002)

 
 
 Concert Pianist Valentina Seferinova

1831 births
1902 deaths
19th-century classical pianists
19th-century German musicians
19th-century German male musicians
German classical pianists
19th-century German Jews
German male classical composers
German male pianists
German music educators
German music theorists
German Romantic composers
Jewish classical composers
Male classical pianists
Musicians from Leipzig
Musicians from Wrocław
People from the Province of Silesia
Piano pedagogues
Academic staff of the University of Music and Theatre Leipzig
20th-century German male musicians
19th-century German musicologists